Fool & Final (stylized as Fool N Final) is a 2007 Indian Hindi-language comedy caper film directed by Ahmed Khan and produced by Firoz A. Nadiadwala. The film has an ensemble cast starring Sunny Deol, Shahid Kapoor, Vivek Oberoi, Ayesha Takia, Sameera Reddy, Paresh Rawal, Johnny Lever, Om Puri, Sharmila Tagore, Arbaaz Khan, Chunkey Pandey, Asrani with Gulshan Grover and Jackie Shroff whilst boxer Mike Tyson appeared in the promos and film credits.

It was released on 1 June 2007.  Most of the film was shot in Brazil, Dubai and Muscat. The film is a remake of the British film Snatch.

Plot
Fool N Final is a story about many people leading lives separate of each other, which intersect while in pursuit of a precious diamond.

An extremely valuable diamond is stolen by Rocky  and his accomplices in Mumbai. He contacts his uncle Choksi  from London who instructs Rocky to hand over the diamond to his brother Lalwaani in Dubai. One of Rocky's accomplices secretly informs Moscow Chikna, a weapons dealer and gangster, about the arrival of the diamond in Dubai.

Elsewhere, Chobey is given an ultimatum of two days by Moscow Chikna to pay off his debt. Chobey runs a junk shop. He is constantly under the pressure of debt taken from many lenders, which he tries to pay off by making his niece Tina  and her boyfriend Raja steal valuable items.

Raja gets paid to visits Munna's  home every week pretending to be his working nephew Rahul. Raja looked exactly like Rahul, who had passed away in an accident. Since Munna and his older brother  felt Lajwanti (Munna's sister-in-law) could not handle the trauma of knowing about Rahul's death, they pay Raja to visit them occasionally. Munna and his brother run a garage in India Colony. Unknown to Munna, his brother actually stole cars and flipped them for sale at the garage.

J.D. is the most powerful don in all of Dubai. He organises illegal fights on which large bets are placed with his bookies. Lucky  and Bob  run a game parlour and owe money to J.D. They recruit fighters for J.D.'s illegal fights to pay off the debt. At the same time, J.D. is on the lookout for a girl named Payal who was illegally trafficked to Dubai and managed to escape J.D.'s men. Before Payal was caught by J.D.'s men at a vegetable market, Munna saves Payal from the thugs. Munna lets Payal stay at their place, where she falls in love with him.

After Lucky and Bob receive an advance from J.D. for recruiting their latest fighter Dang, they spend the money to buy soccer shoes for Lucky's handicapped brother Sunny. While they are shopping for shoes, Bob's car gets stolen by Munna and his friend Abdul. Bob is heartbroken on knowing his car got stolen, and coincidentally goes to Munna's garage to buy a second-hand car. Munna and Bob get into an argument when Bob realises he just bought his own stolen car from the garage. Bob sends Dang to fight against Munna to settle the score, but Munna thrashes Dang, which meant he could not participate in J.D.'s fight. Lucky, Bob, and an injured Dang visit J.D., where a furious J.D. orders Lucky to bring Munna to the scheduled fight, since he was able to beat up a dangerous fighter like Dang all by himself. Lucky visits Munna and convinces him to participate in the fight.

Rocky lands in Dubai with the diamond secured. With time on his hands to spare and a weakness for the latest weapons and gambling, he decides to visit Moscow Chikna. Moscow Chikna offers to give Rocky a high-tech gun if he can go place a bet at J.D.'s bookie counter from where he got banned. Rocky agrees, but visits Lalwaani before going to place the bet. When Lalwaani gets to know that Rocky has a guaranteed tip about the fight, he asks Rocky to place some of his money in the fight too.

Later, Moscow Chikna corners Chobey and Tina in Chobey's shop and asks him to call Raja. When Raja arrives, Moscow Chikna tells the three of them that he'll forgive Chobey's debt if they can kidnap Rocky and get his briefcase from the betting counter in Jumeirah. The three of them hire Puttu Pilot, an incompetent driver who lent money to Chobey, to help them in the kidnapping. While Puttu is parking the car after reaching the betting counter, he knocks into Rocky's car, which leaves Rocky unconscious. Upon hearing that Rocky had gone to gamble, an angry Choksi immediately arrives in Dubai. Choksi and Lalwaani go to the betting counter to stop Rocky from going overboard.

At the fight, J.D. is impressed by Munna's fighting. He asks Lucky to tell Munna to deliberately lose in the third round. But Lucky could not inform Munna on time, which meant Munna also won the third round, leading to a huge loss for J.D. Outside the fighting arena, Chobey, Raja, and Tina mistake Choksi to be Rocky and knock him out. They fear the threat of Moscow Chikna when they realise they could not find Rocky and his briefcase. In desperation, Raja decides to loot the betting counters with which they will pay off Moscow Chikna instead. A sophisticated security system secured the counters from Raja and Chobey while recording their faces with cameras in the room. After unsuccessfully looting the betting counter, Raja encounters a now-conscious Rocky outside the counter and knocks him out.

J.D. coerces Lucky to bring Munna for the next fight in three days. After Lucky completed a few tasks set by Munna, he got Munna to agree to participate in the next fight. Meanwhile, J.D. is immediately informed about the attempted theft by Chobey and Raja at his counter. He decides to find them and make them pay for it.

Chobey, Raja, Tina, and Puttu take Rocky to Chobey's shop, and after looking through his briefcase find the diamond. Raja decides to negotiate a deal with Moscow Chikna at Chobey's shop in exchange for the diamond. Moscow Chikna is not impressed at all and shoots Rocky dead in a fit of anger to scare Raja. Raja reluctantly hands over the diamond. The new problem for Chobey and gang is to dispose of Rocky's dead body from the shop. They get Santa  and Banta to clear the body. Before they could do so, J.D. reaches the shop where he decides to forgive Chobey and Raja for the attempted theft if they can steal the diamond from Moscow Chikna for him.

Choksi and Lalwaani contact the detective Gunmaster G9 to help them locate Rocky and the diamond. G9 quickly figures out he is at Chobey's junk shop where Choksi finds a dead Rocky. G9 threatens Chobey and gang into disclosing to them that the diamond is with Moscow Chikna. G9 knocks out Moscow Chikna in his hideout and gets the diamond for Choksi. Raja plans for Tina, Choksi, Puttu, and himself to go to Moscow Chikna's place in disguise and steal the diamond while G9 and Moscow Chikna fight. They are successful, and escape unhurt even as G9 shot Moscow Chikna dead in front of them. Afterwards at Chobey's junk shop, Munna and Raja get into a fight as Raja did not want to act like Rahul anymore.

As a punishment for avoiding his calls and winning in the previous fight, J.D.'s goons trash Lucky's game parlour and burn down Munna's house respectively. To save the colony from further damage, Munna agrees to fight for J.D. even as Lucky asked him not to.

G9 tracks down Chobey via Puttu's keychain and holds them at gunpoint asking for the diamond. As Raja is about to hand it over, Chobey's dog Hajmola swallows the diamond whole. While shooting at the dog, a rebound bullet from G9's gun hits Choksi and kills him.

When J.D.'s goon finds Chobey and Raja chasing the dog, Chobey misleads the goon by saying the diamond is at India Colony, while hoping Munna there can save them from J.D. At India Colony, the goon finds Payal who had escaped from their hands. J.D. instructed him to burn down the colony and kill Payal in the process. Raja takes it upon himself to save the colony from J.D.'s men.

At the fight, Munna won the first two rounds. Raja calls Lucky to tell him the colony is safe and to instruct Munna to go for the win in the third round as well. After Munna's win, Lucky beats up J.D. and throws him in the sea, where he eventually died as he didn't know how to swim.

In the end, Raja & Tina and Munna & Payal get married and live together with Lajwanti. Chobey gets the diamond out of Hajmola and gets rich by selling it off. He gives Lucky and Puttu their share while Lucky gives all the winnings of the fight to Munna.

The end credits have a special appearance from Mike Tyson.

Cast
 Sunny Deol as Munna
 Shahid Kapoor as Rahul "Raja" Singhania
 Vivek Oberoi as Lucky
 Ayesha Takia as Tina Saluja, Raja's girlfriend
 Paresh Rawal as Choubey, Tina's uncle
 Johnny Lever as Puttu Pilot
 Sharmila Tagore as Lajwanti, Munna's sister-in-law
 Om Puri as Bhaiyya
 Sameera Reddy as Payal Khanna
 Arbaaz Khan as Moscow Chikna
 Jackie Shroff as Gunmaster G9 (Special appearance)
 Gulshan Grover as Choksi
 Zakir Hussain as J.D.
 Vijay Raaz as Abdul Dikki
 Dev Kantawala as Sunny, Lucky's younger brother
 Suresh Menon as Bopal 'Bob' Chaturvedi
 Asrani as Lalwaani, Choksi's brother
 Chunkey Pandey as Rocky, Choksi's nephew
 Razzak Khan as Santa
 Sunil Pal as drunkard at India Colony
 Mike Tyson as Himself (Special appearance)

Soundtrack

The soundtrack contains 4 original songs and 3 remixes.

Reception
Taran Adarsh of Bollywood Hungama gave the film 1.5 out of 5, writing "'On the whole, FOOL & FINAL is all gloss, no substance. At the box-office, given the hype for the film as also the fantabulous promotion embarked by the magnanimous producer [Firoz A. Nadiadwala], the film will attract footfalls in the initial days, but the weak content will tell on the business in the initial weekend itself. Its sustaining power at the ticket window, therefore, is doubtful." Tanveer Bookwala of Rediff.com gave the film 1 star, writing ″The problem with Fool N Final is that it tries to be a 'wholesome' masala movie -- nothing wrong with that, but here, Ahmed Khan and his team of writers (Umesh Shukla and Abbas Hierapurwala)  are trying to cater to every audience and throw in every genre of cinema into this mish-mash of half a dozen dudes.″  Times of India claimed "The first half of the film is a complete washout as it trudges lethargically through a series of misadventures that try to establish the identity of the lead players." Manish Gajjar of BBC.com called the film ″full of gloss and no substance.″

References

External links 
 

2007 films
Indian crime comedy films
2000s Hindi-language films
Films set in the United Arab Emirates
Films scored by Himesh Reshammiya
Indian remakes of British films
Films directed by Ahmed Khan